The Growler Mountains is a 23-mile, (37-km) long north-south trending mountain range of far western Pima County, Arizona that lies  west of Ajo, Arizona. This desert region of southern Arizona lies in the north and central Sonoran Desert, and is one of the drier desert areas of North America.

The Growler Range has the distinction of being on a water divide between two northwest-draining washes to the Gila River. The Growler's are at the headwaters of Growler Valley west of the range which is the southeast drainage to the San Cristobal Wash. The north end of the range is south and southwest of Childs Valley which is part of the Tenmile Wash Drainage. The two drainages are at the beginning of the Gila River's turn from going south-to-west and exiting southwest Arizona with its confluence with the Colorado River at Yuma, Arizona-Winterhaven, California.

Location, and points of interest 
The Growler Mountains are located in the east end of the Cabeza Prieta National Wildlife Refuge; the south end of the range abuts the northern perimeter of Organ Pipe Cactus National Monument, famous for scenery, and wildflowers in wet winters, and also the Organ Pipe Cactus. Summer conditions of high temperature and no water make dirt road travel dangerous at the height of summer.

The Growler Mountains are located at 32.2428-N, 113.0279-W.

See also
List of mountain ranges of Arizona
Growler Valley

References

External links
Trails near Growler Mountains, trails.com (coordinates)
Sheep Peak in Growler Mtns, panorama, about 1.2 mi. NW of Charlie Bell Well, map.

Mountain ranges of the Sonoran Desert
Mountain ranges of Pima County, Arizona
Mountain ranges of Arizona